Robert "Bob" Atkinson,  is a retired police officer who served as the Commissioner of the Queensland Police Service from 2000 until his retirement in 2012. In 2013 Atkinson was appointed one of six Royal Commissioners to the Australian Government Royal Commission into Institutional Responses to Child Sexual Abuse.

Career
Atkinson was sworn in as constable on 30 October 1968 and there began a 44-year career with the Queensland Police Service, where he performed a wide range of operational and managerial roles. In his career with the Queensland Police Service, he served throughout Queensland from Goondiwindi to Cairns. He was a detective for approximately 20 years and acted as the police prosecutor in various Magistrates Courts during this period. Atkinson oversaw reforms after the Fitzgerald inquiry from 1990 and following the Public Sector Management Commission Review and Report Recommendations of the Queensland Police Service in 1993.

In 1989 Atkinson attended the three-month FBI National Academy Course at Quantico, Virginia, in the United States. He again attended the FBI Academy during 2002 for the National Executive Institute Program. Atkinson graduated from Charles Sturt University with a Graduate Certificate in Police Management; he has also completed the Police Executive Leadership Programme at the Australian Institute of Police Management in addition to studies undertaken at the FBI National Academy. He has been conferred with an honorary doctorate by Griffith University.

Honours and awards

Atkinson has also been awarded the Queensland Police Service Medal.

References

External links
 QPS Welcome Message from the Commissioner

Living people
Recipients of the Australian Police Medal
Recipients of the Centenary Medal
Officers of the Order of Australia
Australian royal commissioners
Charles Sturt University alumni
Commissioners of the Queensland Police
Year of birth missing (living people)